Isabel is a female name of Spanish origin. Isabelle is a name that is similar, but it is of French origin. It originates as the medieval Spanish form of Elisabeth (ultimately Hebrew Elisheva), Arising in the 12th century, it became popular in England in the 13th century following the marriage of Isabella of Angoulême to the king of England. Today it is sometimes abbreviated to Isa. The name Isabel is also related to Jezebel, the wife of King Ahab. The pronunciation of which is Tiberian: ʾĪzeḇel

Etymology
This set of names is a Spanish variant of the Hebrew name Elisheba through Latin and Greek represented in English and other European languages as Elisabeth. These names are derived from the Latin and Greek renderings of the Hebrew name based on both etymological and contextual evidence (the use of Isabel as a translation of the name of the mother of John the Baptist). Elisabeth was understood in Spain as a name with the masculine definite article el "the", that is to say *El Isabeth, from it, the short form *Isabeth where the final -el was substituted to -eth, both for aesthetical reasons or feminization, or the entire syllable -bel was substituted to -beth, by analogy with bella "pretty, beautiful".

Notable individuals
Isabel I (1451–1504), Queen of Castile and Léon (1474–1504), Queen consort of Aragon (1479–1504)
 Isabel, Princess Imperial of Brazil (1846–1921)
Isabel Aboy, Spanish actress
 Isabel Allende, Chilean author and niece of Salvador Allende
 Isabel Bayrakdarian, Canadian-Armenian lyric soprano
 Isabel Carrasco, Spanish politician
 Isabel Casimiro, Mozambican sociologist
 Isabel Cleghorn (1852–1922), British educationist and suffragist
 Isabel de Castro, Portuguese actress 
 Isabel de Madariaga, British historian
 Isabel del Puerto, Mexican-American actress 
 Isabel Escobar, Brazilian-American environmental engineer
 Isabel Fillardis, Brazilian actress
 Isabel Godin des Odonais, traveler in the Amazon Basin
 Isabel Granada, Filipino actress
 Isabel Ge Mahe, Chinese businesswoman
 Isabel Gemio, Spanish television presenter 
 Isabel Getty, American singer-songwriter
 Isabel Graham Bryce, British public servant
 Isabel Leonard, American opera singer
 Isabel Lucas, Australian actress and model
 Isabel Macedo, Argentine actress
 Isabel Perón, President of Argentina (1974–1976) and third wife of Juan Perón
 Isabel May, American actress
 Isabel McCorkindale, Australian temperance activist
 Isabel Nkavadeka, Mozambican politician 
 Isabel Nolan, Irish artist 
 Isabel Oli, Filipino actress
 Isabel Luberza Oppenheimer (1901–1974), Puerto Rican brothel owner
 Isabel Ordaz, Spanish actress 
 Isabel Pantoja, Spanish singer
 Isabel Parra, Chilean singer-songwriter
 Isabelle Rauch (born 1968), French politician
 Isabel Ruth, Portuguese actress
 Isabel Sanford, American actress
 Isabel Toledo (1961–2019), Cuban-American fashion designer

Individuals named Isabelle
 Isabella of France (disambiguation), a disambiguation page
 Isabelle of Luxembourg (1247–1298), a daughter of Henry V of Luxembourg and his wife Margaret of Bar
 Isabelle of Orléans (disambiguation), a disambiguation page
 Princess Isabelle (disambiguation), a disambiguation page
 Isabelle Abiera (born 1992), a Filipina actress and model
 Isabelle Adjani (born 1955), a French film actress and singer
 Isabelle Antena, a French singer
 Isabelle Arnould (born 1970), a retired Belgian female freestyle swimmer
 Isabelle Aubret (born 1938), a French singer
 Isabelle Autissier (born 1956), a French sailor, navigator, writer and broadcaster
 Isabelle Amyes (born 1950), an English actress
 Isabelle Blais, a Canadian actress and musician
 Isabelle Blanc (born 1975), a French snowboarder and Olympic champion
 Isabelle Boulay (born 1972), a francophone Canadian pop singer
 Isabelle Boulogne (born 1971), a French sprint canoer
 Isabelle Brasseur (born 1970), a Canadian figure skater
 Isabelle Breitman (born 1959), a French actress and director
 Isabelle von Bueltzingsloewen (born 1964), a French academic and historian
 Isabelle Buret, a French telecommunications and space science engineer
 Isabelle Le Callennec (born 1966), French politician
 Isabel Calvimontes (1790-1855), a Bolivian-born Argentine patriot; one of the Patricias Argentinas
 Isabelle Carbonell, a Belgio-Uruguayan documentary photographer and filmmaker
 Isabelle Caro, a French model suffering from severe anorexia nervosa
 Isabelle Carré (born 1971), a French actress
 Isabelle Champmoreau (born 1974), a New Caledonian politician
 Isabelle Charest (born 1971), a Canadian short track speed skater
 Isabelle Chartrand (born 1978), a Canadian ice hockey player
 Isabelle Cheng (born 1970), an intelligence agent
 Isabelle Collin Dufresne (aka Ultra Violet, 1935–2014), a French-American artist
 Isabelle Corey (1939–2011), a French film actress
 Isabelle Coutant-Peyre (born 1952), a French lawyer
 Isabelle Daniels (1937–2017), an American athlete, who mainly competed in the 100 metres
 Isabelle de Charrière (1740–1805), a Dutch-born writer of the Enlightenment
 Isabelle de Craon (1212-), a French noblewoman
 Isabelle Debré (born 1957), a member of the Senate of France
 Isabelle Delobel (born 1978), a French figure skater
 Isabelle Delorme (1900–1991), a Canadian composer, pianist and music educator
 Isabelle de Meulan (c. 1148 – 1220), a French noblewoman
 Isabelle Demongeot (born 1966), a former French professional tennis player
 Isabelle de Montolieu (1751–1832), a Swiss novelist and translator
 Isabelle Despres, a French slalom canoer
 Isabelle Devaluez (born 1966), a retired French discus thrower
 Isabelle Diks (born 1965), a Dutch GreenLeft politician
 Isabelle Dinoire (born 1967), the first person to undergo a partial face transplant
 Isabelle Duchesnay (born 1963), an ice dancer who competed for both Canada and France
 Isabelle Durant (born 1954), a Belgian politician, member of the Ecolo party
 Isabelle Eberhardt (1877–1904), a Swiss -Algerian explorer and writer
 Isabelle Ferron (born 1967), an actress in both film and stage
 Isabelle Fijalkowski (born 1972), a retired French basketball player
 Isabelle Flory, a French violinist
 Isabelle Fuhrman (born 1997), an American teen actress
 Isabelle Gatti de Gamond (1839–1905), an Italo-Belgian educationalist, feminist and politician
 Isabelle Goldenson (-2005)
 Isabelle Guyon (born 1961), French-born researcher in machine learning
 Isabelle Haak (born 1999), Swedish volleyball player
 Isabelle Holland (1920–2002), an author of children and adult fiction books
 Isabelle Huppert (born 1953), a French actress
 Isabelle Keith (1898–1979), an American actress
 Isabelle LaMal (1886–1952), an American film actress
 Isabelle Lendl (born 1991), an American amateur golfer
 Isabelle Li, Singaporean table tennis player
 Isabelle Liberman (1918–1990), an American psychologist
 Isabelle Lucas (1927–1997), a Canadian-born British actress and singer
 Isabelle Mancini (born 1967), a French cross country skier
 Isabelle Mercier (born 1975), a Canadian professional poker player
 Isabelle E. Merry (1908-2002), Australian Congregational minister and chaplain
 Isabelle Mir (born 1949), a French former Alpine skier
 Isabelle Morneau (born 1976), a defender on the Canada women's national soccer team
 Isabelle Mouthon-Michellys (born 1966), a French athlete
 Isabelle Nanty (born 1962), a French actress and film director
 Isabelle Nylander (born 1990), a Swedish figure skater
 Isabelle Pasco (born 1966), a French actress and model
 Isabelle Pasquet (born 1962), member of the Senate of France
 Isabelle Pearson (born 1981), Canadian judoka
 Isabelle Peretz, a Professor of Psychology at the University of Montreal
 Isabelle Pieman (born 1983), Belgian figure skater
 Isabelle Poulenard (born 1961), French soprano
 Isabelle Rampling (born 1985), Canadian synchronized swimmer
 Isabelle Rezazadeh, also known as Rezz, a Canadian DJ and record producer
 Isabelle Romée (1377–1458), the mother of Joan of Arc
 Isabelle Sadoyan (1928–2017), French actress
 Isabelle Sandy (1884–1975), French poet and writer
 Isabelle Schad (born 1970), German dancer and choreographer
 Isabelle Severino (born 1980), French gymnast and actress
 Isabelle Simonis (born 1967), Belgian politician from the Socialist Party
 Isabelle Stengers (born 1949), Belgian philosopher and the daughter of the historian Jean Stengers
Isabelle Stoehr (born 1979), French professional squash player
 Isabelle Stone, (1868-1944), American physicist
 Isabelle Story (1887–1970), American writer and editor
 Isabelle Turcotte Baird (born 1970), Canadian athlete
 Isabelle Urquhart (1865–1907), American stage actress
 Isabelle Vasseur (born 1959), member of the National Assembly of France
Isabelle Valentin (born 1962), French politician
 Isabelle Vengerova (1877–1956), a Russian-born American pianist and music teacher
 Isabelle Wendling (born 1971), a French handball player
 Isabelle Wéry, a Belgian actress and writer
 Isabelle Westbury (born 1990), an English cricketer
 Isabelle White (1894–1972), a British diver
 Isabelle Yacoubou (born 1986), is a French of Bénin origin professional basketball player

Fictional characters
 Isabelle Andersson, fictional character in the Sune book series, Sune's younger sister
 Isabelle Kruger, a fictional character played by Marion Cotillard in the 2005 film The Black Box
 Isabelle (comics), a Belgian comic book series
 Isabelle of Cornwall, the mother of Tristan in Arthurian legend
 Isabelle Lightwood, fictional character in The Mortal Instruments series and Shadowhunters TV series based on the novel.
 Isabelle Tyler, a fictional character on the USA Network science fiction television series The 4400
 Isabelle (Animal Crossing), an anthropomorphic dog character who was introduced as the mayor's assistant in the Nintendo 3DS game title Animal Crossing: New Leaf

See also
 Isabel (disambiguation)
 Isa (name)

References 

Given names
Feminine given names
English feminine given names
French feminine given names
Portuguese feminine given names
Spanish feminine given names